Edward Graham "Eddie" Cross (born 1940), a Member of Parliament for Bulawayo South, is a Zimbabwean economist and founder member of the mainstream Movement for Democratic Change party led by Nelson Chamisa. He is currently the Policy Coordinator General.

Pre-Independence
Cross's career has been mainly in agriculture. He attended Gwebi College and then worked for the government on land resettlement in the Gokwe district before attending the University of Rhodesia in Salisbury where he received an honours degree in economics. After that he worked as an economist, eventually becoming Chief Economist in the Agricultural Marketing Authority in 1976. He was opposed to white minority rule during the Rhodesian Prime Minister Ian Smith era.

Independence
After the internationally recognised independence of Zimbabwe in 1980, Cross was appointed first to head the Dairy Marketing Board and then the Cold Storage Commission. The CSC was the largest meat-marketing organisation in Africa. He was subsequently CEO of the Beira Corridor Group, which promoted the rehabilitation of the Beira Corridor as an export outlet to the sea for land locked Zimbabwe.

On 10 February 2009, Tsvangirai designated Cross for the position of Minister of State Enterprise and Parastatals as part of the national unity government. He was, however, dropped from the Cabinet list and replaced prior to the Cabinet's swearing in.

Family
He is married to Jeanette and has two children, Gary and Susan as well as four thoroughbred champion horses named Sasha, Laquinta, Charlie, and Mr. Onassis.

References 

 http://www.eddiecross.africanherd.com/
 https://web.archive.org/web/20070927025309/http://www.newzimbabwe.com/pages/inflation39.13255.html
https://web.archive.org/web/20050525021922/http://www.mdczimbabwe.org/Archives/2005/march/eddiecrossupdate.htm
http://zimbabwemetro.com/2008/03/10/for-bulawayo-southeddie-cross/
https://web.archive.org/web/20070820205228/http://voanews.com/english/Africa/2007-07-26-voa50.cfm?renderforprint=1&textonly=1&&TEXTMODE=1&CFID=78481126&CFTOKEN=67935723

Zimbabwean people of British descent
Zimbabwean democracy activists
Members of the National Assembly of Zimbabwe
1940 births
Living people
White Rhodesian people
White Zimbabwean politicians
Movement for Democratic Change – Tsvangirai politicians
People from Bulawayo